The Gibraltar Barbarians Rugby Football Club (GRFC) is a Rugby union club from Gibraltar and the surrounding Campo in Spain, who play in the Andalucian League as Gibraltar Barbarians RFC. They play their home games in the town of Guadiaro near Sotogrande in the Cadiz province of Spain. They currently play in the 1 Division National of the Federacion Andaluza de Rugby (FAR). In 2010, Campo Gibraltar is now a Gibraltar-based team and its name has been changed to Gibraltar Barbarians RFC.

History 
Gibraltar Rugby Football Club was established immediately after the Second World War. After the repatriation of displaced Gibraltarians locals who had learnt to play rugby either at English schools or whilst being in the forces started to play the resident teams from the Army, Navy and RAF in a pitch in neighbouring Spain (given the lack of grass pitches in Gibraltar). Initially the military sides were dominant but by the 1960s the Latin flair which became a trade mark of Gibraltar's style of rugby became evident and GRFC became the dominant force in the area. A local league consisting of  GRFC, Army, Navy and RAF was set up in the mid-1960s which added a more structured and competitive framework within which to play.
 
The closure of the land frontier between Gibraltar and Spain in 1968 saw local rugby diminish in popularity but tag Rugby ensured that it did not entirely disappear. In 1985 the land frontier re-opened and with it the local league once again became an important part of Gibraltar's weekly sporting calendar with games being played in Spain on grass pitches mostly located within 15 minutes of Gibraltar. GRFC prospered within the local league and since 1985 with the exception of three years when the Duke of Wellington Regiment were posted to Gibraltar the GRFC won the league year after year. Games against Spanish sides during the 1980s were played on a friendly basis primarily against sides from Seville and Madrid. Spanish rugby grew in popularity and by 1990 the GRFC began to struggle against premier league sides but enjoyed very competitive games against First Division regional teams in Andalusia.

The reduction in military personnel in 1991/1992 and the positive approach by the Andalusian Rugby Federation that uniquely kept politics out of sport meant that it became clear that the GFRC future was playing within the Andalusian League and the 1992/93 season saw GRFC fully integrated into the Second Division of Andalusia. Players from forces sides joined the GRFC and by 1994 the GFRC were at their strongest historically. In that same year the GRFC were promoted to the First Division almost winning it in the first year. Throughout this period the GRFC toured regularly entering tournaments in Spain and Portugal with considerable success both at 15s and 7s. The highlight was winning the Benidorm 7s tournament Club section in 1996. Ireland won the national section.
 
By 2000, the retirement of a crop of players at the same time led to GRFC dropping to the Second Division where they stayed until 2004/05 when they were once again promoted. In their first year in the First Division they finished third but the failure to produce a youth side meant that they were relegated to the Second Division.

Promotion into the First Division 
During the 2006-2007 season the club played in Group A of the Andalucian Regional League 2, they finished top of the league winning 7 out of 8 games in the process and then went on to beat local rivals Marbella 3-0 in a playoff final on 15 April for promotion back to Regional League 1. 
The GRFC organised a youth section of the club to ensure they gained their rightful place in the First Division.

Rugby in the Primera Division Regional 
Since their promotion into the First Division, Gibraltar have been one of the most consistent teams in their league, maintaining a position in the top half of the table. They finished third behind Malaga and San Jeronimo in the 2009/2010 season.

Youth Rugby 

To maintain their position within the First Division in Andalucia, the GBRFC organised an Under 19s team to be entered into the league. The team was known as the GRFC Colts. The Andalucian Rugby Federation changed the age groups for the 2010/2011 season meaning that the Under 19s would become Under 20s. The GBRFC entered both an Under 18s and 20s team into the Andalucian leagues. The Under 18s would be known as the Gibraltar CG Ice Barbarians and the Under 20s would be known as the Gibraltar CepsaGib Barbarians.

2013/2014 season 

The Barbarians kicked off the 2013/2014 season with a 53-18 home win over long-standing rivals, San Jeronimo of Seville.

See also
 Rugby union in Gibraltar
 Sport in Gibraltar

References

External links
 Andalucia Rugby Federation website
 Spanish Rugby Federation website
 Gibraltar Rugby Official Website

Rugby union in Gibraltar